These are the Billboard magazine R&B albums that reached number-one in 1972.  Of note, Billboard suspended publishing of the R&B Albums chart from August 26 to October 7, so no albums were posted in that time.

Chart history

See also
1972 in music
R&B number-one hits of 1972 (USA)

1972